Ocellularia peremergens is a species of corticolous (bark-dwelling) lichen in the family Graphidaceae. Found in Thailand, it was formally described as a new species in 2002 by lichenologists Natsurang Homchantara and Brian J. Coppins. The lichen has a shiny, pale greenish-grey thallus with a finely verruculose (warted) texture and a white medulla. The apothecia occur solitarily, measuring 0.7–1.2 mm in diameter; they are emergent, meaning they project somewhat above the thallus surface. O. peremergens contains fumarprotocetraric acid, a secondary compound.

References

peremergens
Lichen species
Lichens described in 2002
Lichens of Thailand
Taxa named by Brian John Coppins
Taxa named by Natsurang Homchantara